The Fisher Mall is a mall in Quezon City that opened on January 29, 2014. The location of the mall was formerly occupied by the Pantranco bus terminal. One of the anchors of the mall, Fisher Supermarket, primarily sells fish supplied by Irma Fishing Inc.

Etymology
The Fisher Mall's name is a homage to Mallers Management Corporation President Ray del Rosario's ancestors who initiated Irma Fishing fishing business based in Malabon.

Planned expansions and changes
Mallers Investment Corporation planned to build a 15-storey hotel or a mall annex in 2015–2016. If the hotel component pushed through, it would have been branded under Fisher Mall and have had approximately 110 rooms catering to the mid-range segment, and would've been located beside the mall itself. Instead, a mini park was built beside the mall along Quezon Avenue, known as Fisher Parkway, with tenants like Uniqlo occupying stalls, aside from restaurants and a cinema house.

During the latter half of 2017, the food court was replaced with a food hall patterned after outdoor food parks, dubbed The Galley, occupying the third floor of what was formerly a part of the Fisher Mall department store. Said food court was later demolished and replaced with a wide activity hall with variety stores and thrift shops now occupying the place. Some food stalls later returned in the same area. Again, in 2018 to 2019, the area was reconstructed to have major food tenants occupy the area.

The top floor of the department store was converted into an events hall that can be rented. This reduced the department store area to three floors from five floors. This events center did not last long, and this became the thrift store area after the upper ground floor events center was reconstructed into restaurant stalls. Since 2020, the Bureau of Internal Revenue's District Office No. 40 (RDO # 40), which serves taxpayers of Cubao and southern Quezon City, occupies the place. Another district office, BIR District Office No. 38 (RDO # 38), also known as North Quezon City as it serves taxpayers of central Quezon City, occupies the 4th floor of the mall since 2017.

The supermarket was also expanded, extending to what was once the supermarket's stock room. A doorway at the eastern end of the supermarket was built as well, but was closed in late 2021.

Branches

The first ever branch of the mall is in Quezon City, along Quezon Avenue. Since the opening of their Malabon mall, it has been retroactively renamed as Fisher Mall Quezon Avenue.

Fisher Mall Malabon is the second branch located at the Del Rosarios home town of Malabon at C-4 Road cor. Dagat-Dagatan Ave. The new mall soft-opened on November 29, 2018, and had its grand opening on January 31, 2019.

Apart from their anchor Department Store and Supermarket, the branch has tenants including Yellow Cab Pizza, KFC, Pepper Lunch, and includes the updated The Galley foodcourt.

No other future branches of the mall has been announced so far.

References

External links
Official Facebook Page
Official Twitter Page

Buildings and structures in Quezon City
Real estate companies established in 2014
Retail companies established in 2014
Shopping malls in Quezon City
Shopping malls established in 2014
2014 establishments in the Philippines